Idolerna ("The Idols") is a Swedish pop music group which includes the 1960s pop idols Lalla Hansson, Svenne Hedlund, Tommy Blom and Lennart Grahn. In 2000 their song "Här kommer kärleken" was nominated as "Årets låt på Svensktoppen" ("The Svensktoppen Song of this Year") and in 2001 they were nominated as "Årets svensktoppsartister" ("The Svensktoppen Singers of the Year"). In 2000–01 they went for 3 concert tours in Sweden with total 60 performances together with "Idolorkestern" ("The Idol Orchestra") which included Håkan Almqvist (bass), Micke Littwold (guitar/keyboard), Hasse Olsson (hammond organ), Pelle Alsing (drums) and Billy Bremner (lead guitar).

Discography

Albums 
2000: Idolerna
2001: Greatest Hits, Live & More

Singles 
2001: "Här kommer kärleken"
2001: "Nu leker livet"
2001: "Sommar"

References and sources

External links
Older interview with Idolerna at Allsång på Skansen
Swedish Media Database
folket.se
 
 

Swedish pop music groups
Musical groups established in 2000
Musical groups disestablished in 2001
2000 establishments in Sweden
2001 disestablishments in Sweden